Ivan Mihailov (born 25 December 1944 in Sliven, Bulgaria) is a boxer from  Bulgaria. He competed for Bulgaria in the 1968 Summer Olympics held in Mexico City, Mexico in the featherweight event where he finished in third place.

References
Sports-reference

1944 births
Living people
Olympic boxers of Bulgaria
Olympic bronze medalists for Bulgaria
Boxers at the 1968 Summer Olympics
Boxers at the 1972 Summer Olympics
Olympic medalists in boxing
Sportspeople from Sliven
Bulgarian male boxers
Medalists at the 1968 Summer Olympics
Featherweight boxers